Fourth-seeded Henri Cochet defeated defending champion René Lacoste 6–2, 6–4, 6–3 in the final to win the men's singles tennis title at the 1926 French Championships. The draw consisted of 75 player of which 16 were seeded.

Seeds
The seeded players are listed below. Henri Cochet is the champion; others show the round in which they were eliminated.

  Vinnie Richards (semifinals)
  René Lacoste (finalist)
  Howard Kinsey (quarterfinals)
  Henri Cochet (champion)
  Jean Washer (quarterfinals)
  Jean Borotra (semifinals)
  Charles F. Aeschliman (fourth round)
  Athar-Ali Fyzee (second round)
  Béla Von Kehrling (quarterfinals)
  Nicolae Mișu (quarterfinals)
  Hendrik Timmer (second round)
  Jan Koželuh (fourth round)
  José María Tejada (fourth round)
  Léonce Aslangul (fourth round)
  Guillermo Robson (fourth round)
  J. Colin Gregory (fourth round)

Draw

Key
 Q = Qualifier
 WC = Wild card
 LL = Lucky loser
 r = Retired

Finals

Earlier rounds

Section 1

Section 2

Section 3

Section 4

Section 5

Section 6

Section 7

Section 8

References

External links
 

French Championships - Men's Singles
French Championships (tennis) by year – Men's singles